Kyungsung Univ. · Pukyong Nat'l Univ. Station is a station on the Busan Metro Line 2 in Daeyeon-dong, Nam District, Busan, South Korea.

External links

  Cyber station information from Busan Transportation Corporation

Busan Metro stations
Nam District, Busan
Railway stations opened in 2001
Railway stations at university and college campuses